The following list gives details of locomotives designed by John Chester Craven for the London, Brighton and South Coast Railway between his appointment in 1847 and his retirement in January 1870.

Unlike other locomotive engineers, Craven did not believe in standardisation, but designed individual locomotives for particular jobs.

Locomotives built by Craven

References

Sources
 

London, Brighton and South Coast Railway locomotives
Craven Locomotives
Craven Locomotives
Scrapped locomotives